Caravelí District is one of thirteen districts of the province Caravelí in Peru.

See also 
 Kukuli

References

Districts of the Caravelí Province
Districts of the Arequipa Region